"Boy Like You" is the debut single by Austrian recording artist Charlee. The song was co-written by Kesha, David Gamson and Alex James. It was initially planned for release on Kesha's debut album, Animal but upon halt of its release, it was handed to Charlee for her debut single. "Boy Like You" was released on August 27, 2010 as the lead single from Charlee's debut studio album, This Is Me.

Track listing
Physical release
"Boy Like You (Single Version)" – 03:07
"Boy Like You (The Disco Boys Remix)" – 07:12
Digital download
"Boy Like You (Single Version)" – 03:07
"Boy Like You (The Disco Boys Remix)" – 07:12
"Boy Like You (Vinylshakerz Remix)" – 06:13
"Boy Like You (Tuneverse Remix)" – 04:25
"Boy Like You (Paul Wex Remix)" – 06:59
"Boy Like You (music video)" – 03:07

Release history

Charts

References

2010 singles
2010 songs
Songs written by David Gamson
Songs written by Alex James (songwriter)
Songs written by Kesha
Polydor Records singles